Chuchub may refer to:
 Chuchub, a string of Palembang pitis
  , a populated place in Tixméhuac Municipality, Mexico

See also 
 Chuchube or chuchuba, local Venezuelan Spanish name for the tropical mockingbird
 Chubchub
 Jujube